Jonathan Ahdout (born March 18, 1989) is an American actor known for his role in House of Sand and Fog.

Early life and education
Ahdout was born in Santa Monica, California on March 18, 1989. His parents are Yahya Ahdout and Jacqueline Hayempour, Iranian Jews who lived in Pakistan and Israel before immigrating to the United States in 1982. He attended Sinai Akiba Academy and Harvard-Westlake School. He earned a Bachelor of Arts in film production and Bachelor of Science in business administration and management from University of Southern California.

Career
Ahdout's acting career started with a role in the film House of Sand and Fog, in which he played the part of Esmail Behrani. In 2005, he played the part of Behrooz Araz in the television series 24. In House of Sand and Fog, his character was the son of Shohreh Aghdashloo's character; to his and Aghdashloo's surprise, the same was true when they were cast in 24. In 2007, he appeared in an episode of The Unit.

Filmography

Film

Television

Personal life 
Ahdout resides in Brentwood, Los Angeles with his parents and siblings.

References

External links

1989 births
Living people
21st-century American male actors
American male film actors
American male television actors
American people of Iranian-Jewish descent
Male actors from Santa Monica, California
People from Brentwood, Los Angeles
Actors of Iranian descent
Jewish American male actors
Harvard-Westlake School alumni
University of Southern California alumni
21st-century American Jews